Gessenbach is a river of Thuringia, Germany. It flows into the White Elster in the city Gera.

See also
List of rivers of Thuringia

Rivers of Thuringia
Rivers of Germany